Singles is the first and only compilation album from Scottish alternative rock band Travis. The album was released on 1 November 2004. The album consists of all of the band's singles from 1997 to 2004, as well as including two new tracks, "Walking in the Sun" and "The Distance". The album charted at #4 on the UK Albums Chart, performing considerably better than 12 Memories, actually selling the required 300,000+ copies that were shipped to make it a platinum album.

Track listing
 "Sing" 
 "Driftwood" 
 "Writing to Reach You" 
 "Why Does It Always Rain on Me?" 
 "Re-Offender" 
 "Walking in the Sun" 
 "Tied to the 90's" 
 "Coming Around" 
 "Flowers in the Window" 
 "Love Will Come Through"
 "More Than Us" 
 "Side" 
 "U16 Girls" 
 "Happy" 
 "All I Want to Do Is Rock" 
 "The Beautiful Occupation" 
 "Turn" 
 "The Distance" 
 "Bring Me Round" (Japanese Bonus Track)

Tracks 7, 11, 13, 14 & 15 are from the 1997 album Good Feeling
Tracks 2, 3, 4 and 17 are from the 1999 album The Man Who
Tracks 1, 9 and 12 are from the 2001 album The Invisible Band
Tracks 5, 10 and 16 are from the 2003 album 12 Memories
Tracks 6, 8, 18 and 19 are all stand-alone singles.

 Japanese Bonus DVD
 "U16 Girls"
 "All I Want to Do Is Rock"
 "Tied to the 90's"
 "Happy"
 "More Than Us"
 "Writing to Reach You"
 "Driftwood"
 "Why Does It Always Rain on Me?"
 "Turn"
 "Coming Around"
 "Sing"
 "Side"
 "Flowers in the Window"
 "Re-Offender"
 "The Beautiful Occupation"
 "Love Will Come Through"
 "Walking in the Sun"

Personnel
Fran Healy – lead vocals, rhythm guitar
Andy Dunlop – lead guitar, backing vocals, banjo
Dougie Payne – bass guitar, backing vocals, lead vocals on "The Distance"
Neil Primrose – drums

Charts

Weekly charts

Year-end charts

References

Travis (band) albums
2004 greatest hits albums
Epic Records compilation albums
Independiente Records compilation albums